Hans Schulz (born 4 December 1942) is a German former footballer who played as a midfielder for Werder Bremen, Hamburger SV and Fortuna Düsseldorf, Alemannia Aachen and VSK Osterholz-Scharmbeck.

Schulz played for Werder Bremen in the 1964–65 Bundesliga, and won a final with them.

References

External links
 

1942 births
Living people
German footballers
Association football midfielders
Bundesliga players
2. Bundesliga players
SV Werder Bremen players
Hamburger SV players
Fortuna Düsseldorf players
Alemannia Aachen players
VSK Osterholz-Scharmbeck players